In the aftermath of the September 11 attacks on New York City and Washington, D.C., by the al-Qaeda terrorist group, a number of investigations were conducted to determine what intelligence may have existed before the attacks and whether this information was ignored by authorities.

Clinton era report
In December 1998, the CIA's Counterterrorist Center reported to President Bill Clinton that al-Qaeda was preparing for attacks in the U.S. that might include hijacking aircraft.

April 2001 Massoud speech
Another warning came from Ahmad Shah Massoud, leader of the anti-Taliban Northern Alliance, in April 2001 in a speech before the European Parliament in Brussels, Belgium, in which he asked for humanitarian aid for the people of Afghanistan. Massoud told the parliament that his intelligence agents had gained limited knowledge about a large-scale terrorist attack on U.S. soil being imminent. Massoud was assassinated by al-Qaeda two days before the 9/11 attacks on September 9, 2001.

British intelligence
In the book MI6: Life and Death in the British Secret Service, Gordon Corera says that Britain's spy chiefs had known a terrorist attack was coming. Later, Richard Dearlove said that "the fact that a large-scale terrorist event occurred was not a surprise," and that "the fear was that it would be an attack against American interests probably not in the mainland". Eliza Manningham-Buller recalled that "we had prior intelligence that summer of Al-Qaeda planning a major attack" but that "we didn't know, nor did the Americans, where it was going to take place."

Nebulous reports had coagulated and then dissipated over the summer; in June 2001, British and American intelligence held one of their joint summits, according to Richard Dearlove "the primary topic of discussion was a major terrorist event," and that a routine meeting "turned into something not routine...there was an increase in chatter [intercepted communications], an increase in indicators." That month, the British passed on details that a senior Al Qaeda figure was planning car-bomb attacks against US targets in Saudi Arabia in the coming weeks, but the attack did not happen. A British report from 6 July 2001 read: 'the most likely location for such an attack on western interests by UBL (Usama Bin Laden) and those that share his agenda is the Gulf States or the wider middle east.' A JIC report that month said that attacks were in their final stage of preparation.

Algerian intelligence 
The head of the Algerian state intelligence service DRS, General Mohamed Mediène, known as 'Toufik', had close ties with his counterparts in the US intelligence community, having been received at the Pentagon and CIA headquarters. 

A few days before the attacks of 11 September 2001, he went on a confidential mission to the US. With his American interlocutors, he spoke of an imminent large-scale attack against the United States based on a secret memo sent on September 6, 2001 by Smaïn Lamari, the number two in the DRS at the time. 

Shortly after the attacks, only two civilian planes were authorized to take off: the one carrying members of the Saudi royal family and people close to Bin Laden, and the one bringing Toufik to Algiers.

Bush era reports

May 1, 2001
On May 1, 2001, the CIA informed the White House that "a group presently in the United States" was in the process of planning a terrorist attack.

June 29, 2001
The President's Daily Brief on June 29, 2001, stated that "[the United States] is not the target of a disinformation campaign by Osama Bin Laden". The document repeated evidence surrounding the threat, "including an interview that month with a Middle Eastern journalist in which Bin Laden aides warned of a coming attack, as well as competitive pressures that the terrorist leader was feeling, given the number of Islamists being recruited for the separatist Russian region of Chechnya."

The CIA reiterated that the attacks were anticipated to be near-term and have "dramatic consequences".

July 10, 2001
In July 2001, J. Cofer Black, CIA's counterterrorism chief and George Tenet, CIA's director, met with Condoleezza Rice, the National Security Advisor, to inform her about communications intercepts and other top-secret intelligence showing the increasing likelihood that al-Qaeda would soon attack the United States. Rice listened but was unconvinced, having other priorities on which to focus. Secretary of Defense Donald Rumsfeld questioned the information suggesting it was a deception meant to gauge the U.S. response.

On the same day, FBI Special Agent Kenneth Williams sent a letter to FBI headquarters warning of suspects connected to al-Qaeda who were attending flight schools in Arizona, and demanding further investigation. This document is known as the Phoenix Memo.

August 6, 2001

On August 6, 2001, the President's Daily Briefing, titled Bin Ladin Determined To Strike in US warned that bin Laden was planning to exploit his operatives' access to the U.S. to mount a terrorist strike: FBI information... indicates patterns of suspicious activity in this country, consistent with preparations for hijackings or other types of attack. Rice responded to the claims about the briefing in a statement before the 9/11 Commission stating the brief was "not prompted by any specific threat information" and "did not raise the possibility that terrorists might use airplanes as missiles."

See also
Ali Soufan
September 11 attacks advance-knowledge conspiracy theories
Operation Bojinka - plot by Ramzi Yousef and Khalid Shaikh Mohammed, foiled in 1995, to attack multiple airliners and crash a plane into the CIA

References

Espionage in the United States

Further reading

Special issue of Intelligence and National Security on the intelligence failures leading up to the September 11 attacks.

September 11 attacks